Sinsheim (South Franconian: Sinse) is a town in south-western Germany, in the Rhine Neckar Area of the state Baden-Württemberg about  south-east of Heidelberg and about  north-west of Heilbronn in the district Rhein-Neckar.

Geography

Overview
Sinsheim consists of a town centre and 12 suburbs with a total population of 35,373 (as of December 2011). Its area encompasses . The Elsenz, an unnavigable left-bank tributary of the Neckar, flows through the town, reaching the Neckar at Neckargemünd.

Subdivisions
The list below shows the 12 suburban villages (Stadtteile). Population data was as of 31 December 2020 and the one of Sinsheim (the town proper) was of 12,914.

History
The region around Sinsheim has been settled since 700,000 BC, as shown by the finding of the fossil Homo heidelbergensis in the village of Mauer, about 12 km (7 miles) north of Sinsheim. The Romans ruled the area from 90 AD to 260 AD. The city was possibly founded in about 550 AD by the Frankish nobleman Sunno. It was first historically mentioned in 770 AD in the Codex of the cloister Lorsch. Since 1192, the town had city rights, a privilege first granted by Henry IV, Holy Roman Emperor.

Sinsheim was affected by wars and poverty from the 1500s to the 1700s. Sinsheim-born revolutionary Franz Sigel became a famous Union general in the American Civil War.

The Elsenz Valley Railway and Sinsheim station were opened in 1868 and the nearby Steinsfurt–Eppingen line was opened in 1900; electricity and public water pipes were introduced into the city from 1910 on. The World Wars and the Great Depression kept Sinsheim from growing until the A6 Autobahn was built in 1968. It connected Sinsheim to national and international roads, with Mannheim, Stuttgart, Frankfurt am Main, Heilbronn, Heidelberg, Ludwigshafen all now within an hour by car. While traditionally being an agricultural town, the highway made it into a small industrial centre, but it has been hit by recession and international outsourcing in recent years.

Demographics
The numbers are estimates, census results(¹) or official data of the statistical offices (only primary residences).

¹ census results

Main sights

Sinsheim's main tourist attraction is the Sinsheim Auto & Technik Museum situated in the suburb Steinsfurt, displaying a collection of historic vehicles to over 1 million visitors per year. In 1989, a trade fair area was established that features various industrial and popular events.

Additionally, Sinsheim has a medieval city core; the Altes Rathaus (old Town Hall) is a museum for the town and its role in the 1848 revolution. An old fortress, Burg Steinsberg in the village of Weiler, overlooks Sinsheim. With its octagonal tower, dating back to the 13th century, the fortress has sometimes been called the "compass" of the Kraichgau region, and nowadays contains a restaurant.

Sport

Stadium

On September 19, 2006, the mayor of Sinsheim announced a stadium would be built not far from the Sinsheim Auto & Technik Museum, for the town's most successful football club TSG 1899 Hoffenheim. Construction of the €100 million stadium, which seats 30,164, was funded by Dietmar Hopp, a co-founder and major share holder of software giant SAP and a former player in the youth system of TSG 1899 Hoffenheim. The club christened their new stadium "Rhein Neckar-Arena" on 31 January 2009 with a 2–0 win over Energie Cottbus.

Twin towns – sister cities

Sinsheim is twinned with:
 Barcs, Hungary
 Longué-Jumelles, France

Notable people
Hans Seyffer (c.1460–1509), stone sculptor and wood carver
Franz Sigel (1824–1902), U.S. Army General in the American Civil War
Walter Horn (1908–1995), German-American medievalist scholar
Volker Kauder (born 1949), politician
Christian Eichner (born 1982), football player and manager

References

External links

Towns in Baden-Württemberg
Rhein-Neckar-Kreis
Baden